Ernst Albert Karl Wilhelm Ludwig von Bodelschwingh auf Velmede (26 November 179418 May 1854) was a Prussian politician.

Von Bodelschwingh-Velmede was born in Velmede, near Hamm in the County of Mark as the son of Franz Christoph Gisbert Friedrich Wilhelm von Bodelschwingh, Herr auf Velmede (1754–1827) and his wife Friederike Charlotte Sophie Wilhelmine Henriette von Bodelschwingh, née Freiin von Plettenberg. He studied Law and Cameralism at the University of Berlin and the University of Göttingen. He participated in the Freiheitskriege ("liberty wars"), and at Leipzig earned the Iron Cross first class; he was heavily wounded at Freiburg on 21 October 1813. He subsequently completed his studies at the University of Berlin, and in 1817 entered government service. From 1822 he was an administrator (Landrat) of Kreis Tecklenburg in Westphalia, from 1831 president of the Regierungsbezirk of Trier, and from November 1834 Oberpräsident of the Rhine Province, in which he served during a turbulent time.

In 1842, von Bodelschwingh-Velmede became Finance Minister of Prussia, and Interior Minister in 1845. In 1847, he attempted to lead the United Diet (Vereinigter Landtag), but failed. He did not sympathize with the Revolutions of 1848, and on 19 March resigned to enter the Prussian Abgeordnetenhaus (lower house), first in January 1849 and again after a new electoral law was imposed in 1849. He was later elected to the Erfurt city council as well. In the Prussian legislature he supported the Unionpolitik of the government. In the legislative session from 1850 to 1851 he was leader of the Zentrumspartei. In 1852 he was appointed president of the Regierungsbezirk of Arnsberg. He died in 1854 while on an official trip to Medebach.

His brother, Karl von Bodelschwingh-Velmede, was also active in Prussian politics and Finance Minister of Prussia.

References
 

1794 births
1854 deaths
People from the County of Mark
Prussian politicians
University of Göttingen alumni
Humboldt University of Berlin alumni
Prussian Army personnel of the Napoleonic Wars
Recipients of the Iron Cross (1813)
Recipients of the Iron Cross, 1st class
Interior ministers of Prussia
Finance ministers of Prussia